Isibaya was a South African daily drama series that started production in 2013, premiering on Mzansi Magic and created by Angus Gibson, Desiree Markgraaff, Teboho Mahlatsi, Catherine Stewart and Benedict Carton. Siyabonga Thwala leads the male cast as Mpiyakhe Zungu and Thembi Nyandeni leads the female cast as Mkabayi "MaNcwane" Zungu.

Premise
In the beginning, the drama revolved around two powerful taxi business families in Bhubesini: the Zungus, led by Mpiyakhe Zungu (Siyabonga Thwala), and the Ndlovu family, led by Samson Ndlovu (Bheki Mkhwane), and their conflicts, rivalries, their daily lives and the issues around them. They are united by the marriage of their two children: Thandeka (Nomzamo Mbatha) and S'busiso (Sdumo Mtshali) of the Zungus and Ndlovus, respectively. In a taxi war another man arrives with his family. Judas Ngwenya (Menzi Ngubane) with his wife Beauty Ngwenya (Thuli Thabethe) and their children Zama Ngwenya (Linda Mtoba) and his son and step son to Beauty he was working for his father and plotting against them Zungus. Judas's son Qaphela Ngwenya (Abdul Khoza). They lived with Beauty's mother Lillian Nyandeni (Linda Sebezo) and his nephew Jerry Nyandeni (Charles Phasha). Lillian later married Saddam Xaba (Siyatsheni Mdaki) who was Judas's right hand man. But Judas was killed by his son Qaphela Ngwenya.

Cast 

Recurring cast members include

• Dumisani Dlamini - Mbodla
Hamilton Dlamini - Andile Sibiya
Wendy Gumede - Nolwandle 
Amina Jack - Thokozani Zungu
Thulasizwe Khubheka - Mduduzi
Melusi Mbele - Bhekumuzi
Londeka Mchunu - Londiwe Ngubane
Siyatsheni Mdakhi - Saddam Xaba
Nhlanhla Mdlalose - Bongani
Zakhele Msibi - Sunday Nkabinde
Thulani Mtsweni - Mpihlangene Zungu
Nkanyiso Mzimela - Melusi Zungu
Sihle Ndaba - Cebisile Mkhize
Enerst Ndlovu - Ngwebedla
Sibonelo Ngubane - Mbovu
Charles Phasha - Jerry
Chris Q. Radebe - Dabula Ngubane
Thandeka Qwabe - Thandiwe
Tisetso Thoka - Mickey Sibiya

Cast shown on opening scene
Season 1
Siyabonga Thwala as Mpiyakhe Zungu
Thembi Nyandeni as Mkabayi Zungu
Bheki Mkhwane as Samson Ndlovu
Nomzamo Mbatha as Thandeka Zungu
S'dumo Mtshali as S'busiso Ndlovu
Bongani Gumede as Mandlenkosi Ndlovu
Ayanda Borotho as Phumelele Zungu
Celeste Ntuli as Siphokazi Zungu
Jessica Nkosi as Qondisile Buthelezi
Vusi Kunene as Bhekifa Shezi
Mampho Brescia as Iris Rasebetse - Zungu
Muzi Mthabela as Duma Ngema
Ndu Gumede as Ntandane
Andile Maxakaza as Fezile Khumalo
Zakhele Mabasa as S'khaleni Mngomezulu
Gcina Mkhize as Khanyisile Majola - Ndlovu
Tumisho Masha as Jackson
Samson Khumalo as Kgokong
Lorraine Mphephi as Pamela Mngomezulu
Season 2
Siyabonga Thwala as Mpiyakhe Zungu
Thembi Nyandeni as Mkabayi Zungu
Bheki Mkhwane as Samson Ndlovu
Nomzamo Mbatha as Thandeka Zungu 
S'dumo Mtshali as Sibusiso Ndlovu
Bongani Gumede as Mandlenkosi Zungu
Menzi Ngubane as Judas Ngwenya
Abdul Khoza as Qaphela Ngwenya 
Ayanda Borotho as Phumelele Zungu
Celeste Ntuli as Siphokazi Zungu
Jessica Nkosi as Qondisile Buthelezi-Shezi
Vusi Kunene as Bhekifa Shezi
Mampho Brescia as Iris Rasebetse - Zungu
Pallance Dladla as Jabulani Zungu
Muzi Mthabela as Duma Ngema
Andile Maxakaza as Fezile Khumalo
Zakhele Mabasa as Skhaleni Mngomezulu
Mdu Gumede as Ntandane
Thuli Thabethe as Beauty Ngwenya
Linda Sebezo as Lillian Nyandeni
Samson Khumalo as Kgokong
Lorraine Mphephi as Pamela Mngomezulu 
Linda Mtoba as Zama Nyandeni
Season 3
Siyabonga Thwala as Mpiyakhe Zungu 
Thembi Nyandeni as Mkabayi Zungu
Bheki Mkhwane as Samson Ndlovu
Nomzamo Mbatha as Thandeka Zungu - Ndlovu
S'dumo Mtshali as Sibusiso Ndlovu 
Bongani Gumede as Mandlenkosi Ndlovu 
Menzi Ngubane as Judas Ngwenya 
Abdul Khoza as Qaphela Ngwenya 
Ayanda Borotho as Phumelele Zungu 
Celeste Ntuli as Siphokazi Zungu 
Jessica Nkosi as Qondisile Buthelezi - Shezi
Vusi Kunene as Bhekifa Shezi
Mampho Brescia as Iris Rasebetse 
Andile Mxakaza as Fezile Khumalo
Zakhele Mabasa as S'khaleni Mngomezulu
Mdu Gumede as Ntandane
Thuli Thabethe as Beauty Ngwenya 
Linda Sebezo as Lillian Nyandeni - Xaba
Samson Khumalo as Kgokong
Lorraine Mphephi as Pamela Mngomezulu 
Season 4
Siyabonga Thwala as Mpiyakhe Zungu 
Thembi Nyandeni as Mkabayi Zungu 
Bheki Mkhwane as Samson Ndlovu 
Nomzamo Mbatha as Thandeka Zungu - Ndlovu 
S'dumo Mtshali as S'busiso Ndlovu 
Bongani Gumede as Mandlenkosi Ndlovu 
Menzi Ngubane as Judas Ngwenya 
Abdul Khoza as Qaphela Ngwenya 
Ayanda Borotho as Phumelele Zungu 
Celeste Ntuli as Siphokazi Zungu 
Jessica Nkosi as Qondisile Buthelezi - Shezi
Vusi Kunene as Bhekifa Shezi 
Mampho Brescia as Iris Rasebetse 
Andile Mxakaza as Fezile Khumalo 
Zakhele Mabasa as S'khaleni Mngomezulu 
Mdu Gumede as Ntandane 
Thuli Thabethe as Beauty Ngwenya 
Lidna Sebezo as Lillian Nyandeni
Samson Khumalo as Kgokong
Lorraine Mphephi as Pamela Mngomezulu 
Season 5

Season 6

Season 7
Siyabonga Thwala as Mpiyakhe Zungu 
Thembi Nyandeni as Mkabayi Zungu 
Bheki Mkhwane as Samson Ndlovu 
Nomzamo Mbatha as Thandeka Zungu 
S'dumo Mtshali as Sibusiso Ndlovu 
Bongani Gumede 
Season 8
Siyabonga Thwala as Mpiyakhe Zungu 
Thembi Nyandeni as Mkabayi Zungu 
Bheki Mkhwane as Samson Ndlovu 
S'dumo Mtshali as Sibusiso Ndlovu 
Bongani Gumede as Mandlenkosi Ndlovu 
Enhle Mbali Mlotshwa as Sizakele Sibiya
Ayanda Borotho as Phumelele Dlamini
Celeste Ntuli as Siphokazi Zungu 
Mampho Brescia as Iris Rasebetse 
Andile Mxakaza as Fezile Khumalo 
Zakhele Mabasa as S'khaleni Mngomezulu 
Mdu Gumede as Ntandane 
Gcina Mkhize as Khanyisile Ndlovu
Asavela Mngqithi as Ntwenthle Ndlovu - Ngubane
Lerato Mvelase as Sibongile Mkhize - Zungu
Aubrey Poo as Fenyang Molefenyane
Chris Q Radebe as Dabula Ngubane
Zinhle Mabena as Sihle Ngubane  
Samukele Mkhize as Mabuyi Dlamini 
Amina Jack as Thokozani Zungu 
Sibonile Ngubane as Mbovu
Siyatsheni Mdakhi as Sadam Xaba
Nkanyiso Mzimela as Melusi Zungu
Londeka Mchunu as Londiwe Ngubane

Former Cast Members
Vusi Kunene as Bhekifa Shezi
Nomzamo Mbatha as Thandeka Zungu - Ndlovu
Menzi Ngubane as Judas Ngwenya
 Muzi Mthabela as Duma Ngema
 Tamara Jozi as Mazondi
 Andile Gumbi as Zweli Shezi
Jessica Nkosi as Qondisile Buthelezi 
 Thuli Thabethe as Beauty Nyandeni - Ngwenya
 Linda Mtoba as Zama Nyandeni
 Sibusisiwe Jili as Zanele
 Tumisho Masha as Jackson
 Senzo Vilakazi as Mehlomamba
 Florence Makgatsi as Lerato 
 Samson Khumalo as Kgokong
 Koketso Mophuthing as Kaone
 Kamogelo Mampe as Nurse Ditsele

References

External links
 https://www.screenafrica.com/2014/05/02/tv-radio/gritty-soap-set-against-the-backdrop-of-taxi-industry-mesmerises-viewers/
 https://www.tvsa.co.za/shows/viewshow.aspx?showid=1996

South African drama television series
2013 South African television series debuts